David Angel may refer to:

 David Angel (judge) (born 1944), judge of the Supreme Court of the Northern Territory, Australia
 David Angel (musician) (born c. 1940), American musician, arranger, composer, and teacher
 David Angel (academic) (born 1958), president of Clark University, Worcester, Massachusetts

See also
 David Angell (1946–2001), American producer of sitcoms
 David Angell (diplomat), Canadian diplomat